Sabin is a neighborhood in the Northeast section of Portland, Oregon, United States.  It is bordered by Vernon on the north, King on the west, Irvington on the south, Alameda on the east, and Concordia on the northeast.

See also
 Acadia: A New Orleans Bistro
 Alameda Ridge
 Albina Library

References

External links 
 
Sabin Neighborhood map
Neighborhood map at portlandmaps.com
Sabin Street Tree Inventory Report

 
Neighborhoods in Portland, Oregon